Guaita is one of three towered peaks overlooking the city of San Marino, the capital of San Marino. The other two are Cesta and Montale.

Fortress of Guaita
The Guaita fortress is the oldest of the three towers constructed on Monte Titano, and the most famous. It was built in the 11th century and served briefly as a prison, and was registered as a World Heritage Site in 2008. 

It is one of the three towers depicted on both the national flag and coat of arms.

See also
Cesta (2nd tower)
Montale (3rd tower)
Three Towers of San Marino
Torta Tre Monti

References

Mountains of San Marino
Buildings and structures in the City of San Marino
Towers in San Marino
World Heritage Sites in San Marino
Prisons in San Marino